The 1973 Los Angeles Dodgers finished the season in second place in the Western Division of the National League with a record of 95–66.

Offseason 
 October 26, 1972: Larry Hisle was traded by the Dodgers to the St. Louis Cardinals for Rudy Arroyo and Greg Milliken (minors).
 November 28, 1972: Frank Robinson, Bill Singer, Mike Strahler, Billy Grabarkewitz and Bobby Valentine were traded by the Dodgers to the California Angels for Andy Messersmith and Ken McMullen.
 March 26, 1973: George Culver was purchased by the Dodgers from the Houston Astros.
 March 27, 1973: Dick Dietz was purchased from the Dodgers by the Atlanta Braves.

Regular season

Season standings

Record vs. opponents

Opening Day lineup

Notable transactions 
 April 24, 1973: Tim Johnson was traded by the Dodgers to the Milwaukee Brewers for Rick Auerbach.
 August 10, 1973: George Culver was purchased from the Dodgers by the Philadelphia Phillies.

Memorable events
On April 13 in a game versus the Philadelphia Phillies at Veterans Stadium, Steve Garvey, Davey Lopes, Ron Cey and Bill Russell play together as an infield for the Dodgers for first time, going on to set the record of staying together for 8½ years.

Roster

Player stats

Batting

Starters by position 
Note: Pos = Position; G = Games played; AB = At bats; H = Hits; Avg. = Batting average; HR = Home runs; RBI = Runs batted in

Other batters 
Note: G = Games played; AB = At bats; H = Hits; Avg. = Batting average; HR = Home runs; RBI = Runs batted in

Pitching

Starting pitchers 
Note: G = Games pitched; IP = Innings pitched; W = Wins; L = Losses; ERA = Earned run average; SO = Strikeouts

Other pitchers 
Note: G = Games pitched; IP = Innings pitched; W = Wins; L = Losses; ERA = Earned run average; SO = Strikeouts

Relief pitchers 
Note: G = Games pitched; W = Wins; L = Losses; SV = Saves; ERA = Earned run average; SO = Strikeouts

Awards and honors 
Gold Glove Award
Willie Davis
NL Player of the Month
Willie Crawford (May 1973)
NL Player of the Week
Andy Messersmith (May 14–20)
Willie Crawford (May 21–27)
Willie Davis (July 9–15)

All-Stars 
1973 Major League Baseball All-Star Game
Jim Brewer reserve
Willie Davis reserve
Manny Mota reserve
Claude Osteen reserve
Bill Russell reserve
Don Sutton reserve
TSN National League All-Stars
Bill Russell
Baseball Digest Rookie All-Stars
Ron Cey
Davey Lopes

Farm system

1973 Major League Baseball Draft

This was the ninth year of a Major League Baseball Draft.  The Dodgers drafted 22 players in the June draft and nine in the January draft.

The most notable player from this draft class was outfielder Joe Simpson, who played from 1975–1983 but made his mark primarily as a broadcaster for the Atlanta Braves. The Dodgers first round pick was catcher Ted Farr of Shadle Park High School in Spokane, Washington. He played 339 games from 1973–1977 in the Dodgers farm system, hitting .235.

Notes

References 
Baseball-Reference season page
Baseball Almanac season page

External links 
1973 Los Angeles Dodgers uniform
Los Angeles Dodgers official web site

Los Angeles Dodgers seasons
Los Angeles Dodgers season
Los Angel